Claude Bailey (19 November 1895 – June 1950) was a British actor.  He was born and died in London.

Partial filmography
 Little Waitress (1932)
 The Unholy Quest (1934)
 The Saint Meets the Tiger (1941)
 Hatter's Castle (1942)
 Unpublished Story (1942)
 The Saint Meets the Tiger (1943)
 He Snoops to Conquer (1944)
 Don't Take It to Heart (1944)
 The Hundred Pound Window (1944)
 Bedelia (1946)
 The Calendar (1948)
 Elizabeth of Ladymead (1948)

References

External links

1895 births
1950 deaths
Male actors from London
English male film actors
20th-century English male actors